Laura Witte (April 16, 1869 — November 15, 1939) was an American who became a women’s rights activist and suffragette in Germany during the early 20th century.

Formative years
Born on April 16, 1869 in Brooklyn, New York, Laura Elisabeth Theodore Roth was the eldest daughter of Johannes Roth (1837-1894), a cotton merchant, and his wife, Jane (Bean) Roth (1841-1901). A sister of sculptor Frederick Roth (1872-1944), Laura Witte was also the aunt of politician Annemarie von Harlem (1894-1983).

Hoping to improve her education, she traveled to Germany to the community of Bremen, where her family had a home, and to Rostock, where her uncle Friedrich Roth resided. While in Germany, she met Friedrich Carl Witte (1864–1938), a German chemist, whom she married on June 7, 1892, and with whom she had five children: Johanna (born circa 1893), Friedrich (born circa 1895), Siegfried (1897–1961), Elisabeth (born circa 1903), and Carl August (born circa 1908).

Sometime after 1908, Witte became a volunteer in early childhood education centers and also actively began lecturing about the need to create equal rights for women while campaigning on behalf of the Mecklenburg State Association for Women's Suffrage.

By 1915, she was serving on multiple boards of directors, including the Association for Social Aid Work.

After becoming a member of the German Democratic Party, Witte was appointed to chair the party's women's group in 1919. That same year, she addressed the chapter of the German Democratic Party located in Bad Doberan. Speaking about "The woman in the new Germany,” she reflected on the status of women who had been granted the right to vote in 1918, and advocated for equal pay for women.

Death
Laura Witte died in Rostock, Germany on November 15, 1939.

References

External links
 Letters to and from Laura Witte, in Witte Family Correspondence, in Rostock City Archives. Archive Portal: Mecklenburg-Western Pomerania, retrieved online May 10, 2021.

1869 births
1939 deaths
20th-century American people
Suffragettes
German women's rights activists